Cushamen is a town in Chubut Province, Argentina. It is the head town of the Cushamen Department.

Cushamen is located in the wild plains of Patagonia, its name means "place of solitude" in Mapuche.

The town is home to a Regional Indigenous Museum, which features various artefacts, including pottery and fabrics.

Climate

References

External links

 El Maiten

Populated places in Chubut Province
Mapuche language